Daharki Tehsil is an administrative subdivision (tehsil) of Ghotki District in the Sindh province of Pakistan. It is administratively subdivided into seven union councils, one of which forms the capital Daharki.

Demography
At the time of the 2017 Census of Pakistan, the distribution of the population of Daharki Tehsil by first language was as follows:
 91.3% Sindhi
  2.6% Punjabi
  2.5% Urdu
  2.0% Saraiki
  0.6% Balochi
  0.4% Hindko
  0.3% Pashto
  0.1% Brahui
  0.0% Kashmiri
  0.1% Others

Industry

 Engro fertilizer
 Mari Petroleum Company Limited Daharki

Social welfare
Pitafi Welfare Organization is working for the education and health of the poor. Meer Murtaza Pitafi is the founder of PWO. Its headquarter is in Keenjhar Pitafi and it is spreading quickly in other areas.

References

Talukas of Sindh
Ghotki District